Jiří Zelenka (born 17 August 1972) is a Czech ice hockey forward. He played 15 seasons for HC Sparta Praha.

Zelenka scored 69 goals in Czechoslovak Extraliga and 199 goals in Czech Extraliga.

Zelenka played 24 games and scored 13 goals in Euroleague.

External links

1972 births
Living people
Czech ice hockey right wingers
Espoo Blues players
EHC Freiburg players
HC Kometa Brno players
HC Plzeň players
HC Sparta Praha players
Ice hockey people from Prague
HC Tábor players
Czech ice hockey coaches
Czechoslovak ice hockey right wingers
Czech expatriate ice hockey players in Finland
Czech expatriate ice hockey players in Germany